Malmö District Court is a law court in Malmö, Sweden whose jurisdiction includes the municipalities of Burlöv, Malmö and Vellinge. Malmö District Court comes under the Court of Appeal for Skåne and Blekinge.

In 2014 a building in which part of the court operates was targeted by a bomb which caused minor damage. Later the same year another more powerful bomb planted at the entrance by unknown perpetrators. The second bomb was powerful to destroy its entrance and damaged windows and balconies of nearby buildlings but no people were hurt. As a result, the wisdom of placing the court building of a volatile city in a residential area was questioned by officials.

See also
 District courts of Sweden

References

External links
Official site

Courts in Sweden
Buildings and structures in Malmö
Government buildings in Sweden
Schmidt Hammer Lassen buildings